Helvella corium is a species of fungus in the family Helvellaceae of the order Pezizales. This inedible cup-shaped fungus is black, and grows on the ground often near willows in deciduous or mixed forests. Although it has a fairly wide distribution, it is uncommon.

Description
The upper margin of the fruit body cup may be rounded with scalloped or lobed edges (crenate). The odor and taste are not distinctive.

The spores are ellipsoid in shape, and measure 17–21 by 10–12 µm. They are hyaline (translucent), and contain a single central oil drop (guttulate). The spore-bearing cells, the asci, are 225–250 by 12–17 µm.

Edibility
Unknown - consumption of this fungus is not recommended as similar species in the family Helvellaceae contain the toxin gyromitrin.

Distribution and habitat

Helvella corium has been collected from Asia, Europe, and North America. Fruit bodies grow solitary, scattered, or clustered in groups. It is often found in association with the trees Populus tremuloides or Thuja plicata, or with shrubs from genus Salix (such as Salix herbacea and Salix glauca), Shepherdia canadensis or shrubs from the genus Dryas. Jordan notes a preference for growing on sandy soils or in dunes.

This mushroom appears to have a high tolerance for otherwise inhospitable growing conditions, as it has been found growing on caustic spoil mounds (the end-product of many mining and manufacturing operations) of a alkali factory in Krakow, Poland, as well as on abandoned uranium tailings in Ontario, Canada.

Similar species

References

corium
Fungi described in 1873
Fungi of Europe
Fungi of North America
Fungi of Asia